"Let's Pretend" is a song by Raspberries, released in March 1973 as the second single from their second LP, Fresh. It was written by band leader Eric Carmen, who also provided the lead vocals.

The song reached the top 40 on three principal US charts, including at number 35 on the Billboard Hot 100, and number 14 on Record World. It was also a number 13 hit in Canada, becoming their second greatest hit in that country. The song spent 16 weeks on the Billboard chart, longer than any of their other singles except for their greatest hit, "Go All the Way", which lasted 18 weeks.

Cash Box said that the "Raspberries change the pace a bit and deliver a strong semi-ballad with all the grace and capabilities of the Beatles early sound."

Background
Eric Carmen stated that "Let's Pretend" is one of the best melodies he has ever written, and that he reused part of it for his first solo hit, "All By Myself". He said the song lyrics about young people in love dreaming about eloping and making a life together are a recreation of the concept in Beach Boys' song "Wouldn't It Be Nice".

Television performance
"Let's Pretend" was performed on The Midnight Special television program (season 1, episode 15) on May 4, 1973. The show was hosted by Johnny Nash.

Later uses
"Let's Pretend" was included on the Raspberries Pop Art Live CD set from their reunion concert recording, November 26, 2004, at the House of Blues in Cleveland, Ohio, released August 18, 2017.

Chart performance

Weekly charts

Year-end charts

Cover versions
 "Let's Pretend" was covered by the Bay City Rollers in 1976 on their album, Dedication.  
 In 1978, the song was also done by Joey Travolta on his 1978 eponymous debut LP.
 The Lettermen included "Let's Pretend" in a medley with the Raspberries' first hit, "Don't Want to Say Goodbye" on their 1979 LP covering 1970s love songs entitled Love Is....

References

External links
 Lyrics of this song
 
 

1973 songs
1973 singles
Raspberries (band) songs
Capitol Records singles
Pop ballads
Songs written by Eric Carmen
Song recordings produced by Jimmy Ienner